Xinbao'an railway station is a station on the Beijing–Baotou railway located in the town of Xinbao'an, Huailai County, Hebei.

See also

List of stations on Jingbao railway

Railway stations in Hebei